Oberkirch may refer to:

Oberkirch (Baden), a town in Baden-Württemberg, Germany
Oberkirch, Switzerland, a municipality in the canton of Lucerne, Switzerland
Henriette Louise de Waldner de Freundstein, Baronne d'Oberkirch